Csík (Hungarian, in Romanian: Ciuc) was an administrative county (comitatus) of the Kingdom of Hungary. Its territory is now in central Romania (eastern Transylvania). The capital of the county was Csíkszereda (now Miercurea Ciuc).

Geography

Csík county shared borders with Kingdom of Romania and the Hungarian counties of Beszterce-Naszód, Maros-Torda, Udvarhely and Háromszék. The county was situated in the Carpathian Mountains, around the sources and upper courses of the rivers Olt and Mureș. Its area was 4,859 km2 around 1910.

History

Csík county consisted of three former seats of the Székelys: Csíkszék, Gyergyószék and Kászonszék (the latter two as filial seats of the former). It was formed in 1876, when the administrative structure of Transylvania was changed. In 1920, by the Treaty of Trianon, the county became part of Romania. It was returned to Hungary by the Second Vienna Award of 1940. After World War II, it became again part of Romania. Most of its territory lies in the present-day Romanian county of Harghita, with small parts in Suceava, Neamț and Bacău.

Demographics

Subdivisions

In the early 20th century, the subdivisions of Csík county were:

See also
Harghita County of Romania

Notes

References 

States and territories established in 1940
States and territories disestablished in 1920
States and territories disestablished in 1945
Kingdom of Hungary counties in Transylvania